Mikel Conrad (30 July 1919 – 11 September 1982) was an American actor and film director, writer and producer. He was born in Columbus, Ohio and died in Los Angeles, California at the age of 63.

Filmography

Actor

 Untamed Fury (1947) - 'Gator-Bait' Blair
 Border Feud (1947) - Elmore
 The Gangster (1947) - Thug (uncredited)
 Check Your Guns (1949) - Henchman Ace Banyon
 The Wreck of the Hesperus (1948) - Angus McReady
 Phantom Valley (1948) - Henchman Craig (uncredited)
 The Gallant Blade (1948) - Officer (uncredited)
 The Man From Colorado (1948) - Morris (uncredited)
 South of St. Louis (1949) - Lieutenant (uncredited)
 Take One False Step (1949) - Freddie Blair
 Mr. Soft Touch (1949) - Officer Miller (uncredited)
 Sand (1949) - Tony (uncredited)
 Arctic Manhunt (1949) - Mike Jarvis
 Abbott and Costello Meet the Killer, Boris Karloff (1949) - Sgt. Stone
 Illegal Entry (1949)
 The Flying Saucer (1950) - Mike Trent
 Francis the Talking Mule (1950) - Major Garber
 The Bandit Queen (1950) - Captain Gray
 Million Dollar Pursuit (1951) - Louie Palino
 Westward the Women (1952) - Rose's Man (uncredited)
 Hoodlum Empire (1952) - Chunce (uncredited)
 Carson City (1952) - Workman (uncredited)
 Untamed Women (1952) - Steve Holloway
 Godzilla, King of the Monsters! (1956) - George Lawrence (uncredited)

Director
 The Flying Saucer (1950)

References

External links

1919 births
1982 deaths
American male film actors
American film directors
Male actors from Columbus, Ohio
20th-century American male actors